Australian electronic music band Cut Copy have released six studio albums, four mix albums, four extended plays, twenty-two singles, four promotional singles and fourteen music videos.

Cut Copy debuted with the EP I Thought of Numbers in September 2001. Their debut studio album, Bright Like Neon Love, was released in April 2004, but failed to chart. The band achieved biggest commercial and critical success with their second studio album, In Ghost Colours, released in March 2008, which reached number one in their home country and gathered positive reviews. The album spawned the band's two highest-charting singles in Australia, "Lights & Music" and "Hearts on Fire".

The group's third studio album, Zonoscope, was released in February 2011, reaching number three in Australia and attaining modest success internationally. Free Your Mind, their fourth studio album, was released in November 2013 to minor commercial success, but 2017's Haiku from Zero failed to match the performance of its predecessors.

Albums

Studio albums

Remix albums

Extended plays

Singles

Promotional singles

Guest appearances

Remixes

Music videos

Notes

References

External links
 
 
 
 

Discographies of Australian artists
Electronic music discographies
Pop music group discographies